Maraîchers is a station of the Paris Métro, on the Rue des Maraîchers.  The station was opened on 10 December 1933 with the extension of the line from Richelieu - Drouot to Porte de Montreuil. The name of the street, Rue des Maraîchers is French for "street of the market-gardeners". Until the 20th century the hills of Belleville and Montreuil were cultivated by many market-gardeners, whose most famous products were the "peaches of Montreuil".

Station layout 

Paris Métro stations in the 20th arrondissement of Paris
Railway stations in France opened in 1933